The second season of The Twilight Zone aired Fridays at 10:00–10:30 pm (EST) on CBS from September 30, 1960 to June 2, 1961. There are 29 episodes.

Intro
This season debuted the theme music by Marius Constant most often associated with The Twilight Zone, replacing the first season music written by Bernard Herrmann. The graphics used for the intro were a hybrid of the two sets of graphics used for the first season, with some slight modifications to Rod Serling's narration. For the first three episodes Serling's narration went as follows:

"You're traveling through another dimension. A dimension not only of sight and sound but of mind. A journey into a wondrous land of imagination. Next stop—The Twilight Zone."

For the subsequent episodes some phrases were added, with the same set of graphics:

"You're traveling through another dimension. A dimension not only of sight and sound but of mind. A journey into a wondrous land whose boundaries are that of imagination. That's the signpost up ahead. Your next stop—The Twilight Zone."
  
This opening was added to some first season episodes that were aired as repeats during the summer of 1961. In most of these Herrmann's theme music continued to be played for the closing credits.

Episodes

References

 

1960 American television seasons
1961 American television seasons
59 series